Battery Rock is a limestone bluff located at Mile 860 of the Ohio River in Hardin County, Illinois, across from Caseyville, Kentucky. The bluff is a prominent navigational landmark along the river.

The site played a role in several conflicts during the Civil War. In 1862, the Union Army based its troops at Battery Rock during a standoff with Confederate troops at Caseyville; the standoff ended when the Union troops moved to Caseyville, found that the Confederates had left the town, and punished the rebellious residents. The bluff also played a role in Confederate general Stovepipe Johnson's attack on riverboats in 1864. During the attack, boats used the landing at Battery Rock as a safe harbor and a place to monitor the situation. In addition, two Union recruiters from Kentucky used the bluff as a recruiting station in 1864, and either a Union garrison or a local defense force placed two cannons at the site; graffiti left by an Indiana regiment has also been found at the site.

The bluff was used as a filming location for the film How the West Was Won in the 1960s.

Battery Rock was added to the National Register of Historic Places on November 5, 1998.

See also
Thompson Brothers Rock Art, a Civil War site in Union County

References

Ohio River
American Civil War sites
Illinois in the American Civil War
Natural features on the National Register of Historic Places
Landforms of Hardin County, Illinois
Cliffs of the United States
National Register of Historic Places in Hardin County, Illinois
Conflict sites on the National Register of Historic Places in Illinois
American Civil War on the National Register of Historic Places